The Youth Parliament or Youth Parliament Program (YPP), an integral part of the Swatantrata Center, is a liberal public policy think-tank based in India which focuses on ideas and policies that cause human flourishment and India's Future Foundation,  Foundation for Democratic Reforms under the leadership of Raghavendar Askani and Dr. Jayaprakash Narayan for the youth, to speak up and make an impact on the change agenda for the country.

The Youth Parliament Program would be a debate between the best debaters, policymakers, and opinion-makers. The platform is meant to inspire the youth to express their views in an organized way.

Programmes

Model Youth Parliament Program
The Model Youth Parliament Programs (YPP) lay a bridge between youth, like-minded people working for society, and government by providing a common platform and foster for a healthy discussion on political reforms, parliamentary activities, policymaking, education, and employment.

Leadership Boot Camp
The Leadership Boot Camp is a flagship project of Youth Parliament Program (YPP) that focuses on three areas: Policy Development, Sustainable Development Goals, and Technology. This program provides an understanding of contemporary reforms in the world and helps them grab the networking opportunities to facilitate knowledge-sharing, connections, and real-time action on these issues.

References

External links
 
 Foundation for Democratic Reforms

Model Governments, Youth
Model governments
 
Advocacy groups
Youth-led organizations